Lee Ho-seong may refer to:
Lee Ho-seong (baseball) (1967–2008), South Korean baseball player, thief and murderer, suicide by drowning
Lee Ho-seong (fencer) (born 1968)
Lee Ho-sung (footballer) (born 1974), South Korean football player